James Aston, 5th Lord Aston of Forfar (23 May 1723 – 24 August 1751), was a son of Walter Aston, 4th Lord Aston of Forfar, and Lady Mary Howard.

On 30 June 1742, James married Lady Barbara Talbot, sister of the 14th Earl of Shrewsbury, by whom he had two daughters.

In 1748, he succeeded his father as Lord Aston of Forfar in the Peerage of Scotland.

Lord Aston produced no direct male heir, and on his death in 1751 his title passed to his distant cousin Philip Aston, 6th Lord Aston of Forfar.

See also
Lord Aston of Forfar

Aston of Forfar, James Aston, 5th Lord
1723 births
1751 deaths